Francisco Ramón de Jesús Aguilar Barquero (21 May 1857 – 11 October 1924) served as provisional President of Costa Rica for eight months between 1919 and 1920.

He was Governor of Cartago, Deputy for Limón (1888–1889), Secretary of War and Navy (1889), Deputy for Cartago (1890–1892), Deputy for San José (1912–1916) and Third Appointed to the Presidency (1914–1917).

His main achievement was successfully steering the country back to democratic normalcy after his predecessor's military dictatorship.

He was succeeded by Julio Acosta García.

References

1857 births
1924 deaths
Presidents of Costa Rica
Vice presidents of Costa Rica
National Union Party (Costa Rica) politicians
People from Cartago Province

Costa Rican liberals